Kazipara metro station (romanised: Kajeepara metro steshen) is a metro station of the Dhaka Metro's MRT Line 6. This station is located in Kazipara, Dhaka. The station commenced operation from 15 March 2023.

Station

Station layout

References

Dhaka Metro stations
Railway stations opened in 2023
2023 establishments in Bangladesh